Dmitri Budõlin (born 1 March 1974) is an Estonian judoka.

Achievements

References

1974 births
Living people
Estonian male judoka
20th-century Estonian people
21st-century Estonian people